The governor of Tasmania is the representative in the Australian state of Tasmania of the Monarch of Australia, currently King Charles III. The incumbent governor is Barbara Baker, who was appointed in June 2021. The official residence of the governor is Government House located at the Queens Domain in Hobart. As the sovereign predominantly lives outside Tasmania, the governor's primary task is to perform the sovereign's constitutional duties on their behalf.

As with the other state governors, the governor performs similar constitutional and ceremonial functions at the state level as the governor-general of Australia does at the national level. The position has its origins in the positions of commandant and lieutenant-governor in the colonial administration of Van Diemen's Land. The territory was separated from the Colony of New South Wales in 1825 and the title "governor" was used from 1855, the same year in which it adopted its current name. In accordance with the conventions of the Westminster system of parliamentary government, the governor now acts solely on the advice of the head of the elected government, the premier of Tasmania.

Tasmania retained British-born governors longer than most other states. The first Australian-born governor was Sir Stanley Burbury (appointed 1973) and the first Tasmanian-born governor was Sir Guy Green (appointed 1995).  Since Burbury, all Tasmanian governors have been Australian-born, except for Peter Underwood who was born in Britain but emigrated to Australia when a teenager.

Titles
Since December 2014, the incumbent and all future Tasmanian governors have been entitled to be styled as The Honourable for life.

Governor's personal flag
The personal flag of the governor of Tasmania is the same design as the British blue ensign with the Union Flag at the upper left quarter. On the right side, the state badge of Tasmania, consisting of a white disk with a red lion passant, is surmounted by St. Edward's Crown.  The flag was adopted in 1977.
 
If the standard is flying at Government House, on a vehicle or vessel, or at an event, this indicates that the governor is present.
 
Past and present flags of the governor

Divided in two
Between 1804 and 1813, Van Diemen's Land was divided along the 42nd parallel, and the two sections governed as separate lieutenant-governorships under the governor of New South Wales. Collins was the only officially appointed lieutenant-governor—upon his death in 1810, the government in Hobart Town was administered, by the Commandants at Hobart Town (Lord, Murray and Geils). The northern settlement at Port Dalrymple (now George Town) was administered by four commandants until the settlements were merged to form the single colony under the governorship of Thomas Davey in 1813.

Lieutenant-governors and commandants in the south

Commandants in the north

List of governors of Tasmania

Lieutenant-governors
The colony was called Van Diemen's Land until 1856.

Governor-in-chief

Governors

References

 Governors and Lieutenant Governors of Tasmania
 Parliamentary Library – Governors of Tasmania

Tasmania
Parliament of Tasmania
Governors